is a Japanese darts player. She was a two-time back-to-back British Darts Organisation (BDO) women's world champion. She plays in events of the World Darts Federation (WDF).

Career
Suzuki is an experienced soft-tip darts player, having competed in many tournaments and professional tours in her home country of Japan, as well as across east Asia. She began playing darts in her late twenties, winning many mainly soft-tip tournaments in Asia before becoming BDO World Champion aged 36 in 2019.

BDO titles
In 2018, Suzuki qualified for the 2019 BDO World Darts Championship as a qualifier, where she caused a huge upset by defeating the reigning champion and number two seed and four-time champion Lisa Ashton in the first round, 2 sets to 0. At the Quarter-Final stages of the championship, she defeated Dutch player Sharon Prins by the same score to reach the Semi-Final. In the Semi-Finals, once again by 2 sets to 0, she defeated Maria O'Brien, keeping her Lakeside record of dropping no sets fully intact to reach her first BDO World Darts Championship final on her debut. She went on to defeat Lorraine Winstanley 3–0 to win the title on her debut year.  She did not drop a set en route to the title, and only lost two legs in the Final.
Former professional darts player and current pundit Chris Mason said of her victory on Eurosport that: "She is the Phil Taylor of the ladies' game. He raised the bar for the men, this is the same for the ladies' game."
Suzuki was also the Ladies' Singles winner in the 2019 Dutch Open.

Suzuki retained her BDO title in 2020, beating Lisa Ashton in the 2020 BDO World Darts Championship final.

Future plans
Suzuki participated in PDC UK Q-School in 2020, but was unable to obtain a tour card after losing to Nathan Rafferty.
After losing narrowly to retired darts legend Phil Taylor in a virtual Sky Sports game during the COVID-19 pandemic, Suzuki indicated that she intends to play in events around the world once the crisis is over and accepts it may be necessary for her to move to the UK in order to pursue her dream of obtaining a tour card and playing in PDC events.

World Championship results

BDO/WDF
 2019: Winner (beat Lorraine Winstanley 3–0)
 2020: Winner (beat Lisa Ashton 3–0)
 2022: Second round (lost to Aileen de Graaf 1–2)

PDC
 2020: First round (lost to James Richardson 2–3)

References

External links
Twitter
 Mikuru Suzuki's profile and stats on Darts Database

Living people
Japanese darts players
1982 births
BDO women's world darts champions
Professional Darts Corporation associate players
People from Takamatsu, Kagawa
Professional Darts Corporation women's players